The 2016–17 Florida Gators women's basketball team represented the University of Florida in the sport of basketball during the 2016–17 women's college basketball season. The Gators compete in Division I of the National Collegiate Athletic Association (NCAA) as members of the Southeastern Conference (SEC). The Gators, led by tenth-year head coach Amanda Butler, played their home games in the O'Connell Center on the university's Gainesville, Florida campus. They finished the season 15–16, 5–11 in SEC play to finish in a tie for eleventh place. They advanced to the second round of SEC women's tournament where they lost to Texas A&M.

On March 6, the school fired Amanda Butler. She finished at Florida with a 10 year record of 190–136.

Previous season
The Gators finished the season 22–9, 10–6 in SEC play to finish in a tie for fourth place. They lost in the quarterfinals of the SEC women's tournament to Kentucky. They received an at-large bid to the NCAA women's tournament where they were upset by Albany in the first round.

Roster

Coaches

Schedule and results

|-
!colspan=12 style="background:#0021A5; color:#FFFFFF;"| Non-conference regular season

|-
!colspan=12 style="background:#0021A5; color:#FFFFFF;"| SEC regular season

|-
!colspan=12 style="text-align: center; background:#0021A5"|SEC Women's Tournament

Source:

Rankings
2016–17 NCAA Division I women's basketball rankings

See also
 2016–17 Florida Gators men's basketball team

References

Florida Gators women's basketball seasons
Florida
Florida Gators
Florida Gators